Niklasdorf is a municipality in the district of Leoben in the Austrian state of Styria.

Population

References

Cities and towns in Leoben District